The Perfect Machine is a 2005 album by Vision Divine. It is a concept album dealing with a scientist who is able to put an end to death and disease for all mankind, and thus make the human race immortal. The story considers the social and religious aspects of what such a discovery could bring.

Track listing

All music written by Carlo Andrea Magnani (Olaf Thorsen), Oleg Smirnoff and Michelle Luppi. All lyrics by Thorsen.

 The Perfect Machine (7:58)
 1st Day Of A Never-ending Day (6:13)
 The Ancestors' Blood (5:53)
 Land Of Fear (4:25)
 God Is Dead (5:21)
 Rising Sun (5:23)
 Here In 6048 (6:32)
 The River (4:29)
 Now That You've Gone (5:59)
 The Needle Lies (Japan only, Queensrÿche cover)

Credits
Olaf Thorsen - Guitars
Federico Puleri - Guitars
Michele Luppi - Vocals
Oleg Smirnoff - Keyboards and Piano
Andrea "Tower" Torricini - Bass
Danil Morini - Drums

2005 albums
Vision Divine albums
Concept albums
Scarlet Records albums